was a Japanese ryūkōka singer from the early Shōwa era.

Life and career

He made his debut in 1936 with the song  on Taihei Records. In 1937 he moved to Polydor Records where he assumed the professional name Rentarō Kita, a name chosen for its play of sound on the name of composer Rentaro Taki. During this period Kita enjoyed the peak of his fame, but his career abruptly ended with his sudden death from leukemia in 1940 at the age of 20.

Musicians from Yamagata Prefecture
1920 births
1940 deaths
20th-century Japanese male singers
20th-century Japanese singers
Deaths from leukemia
Deaths from cancer in Japan